Ravi Paturi was an academician from India. As a principal of Aurora Degree College and Business School, he contributed to the fields of research and literature.

Life
He was the last son of Paturi Sitaramanjaneyulu, a famous Sanskrit scholar from Adoni. He received doctorate from Osmania University. He joined Aurora Degree College as the Principal in 1999 and continued in the post till his death. During this tenure, he held good ties with premier institutes in India such as Centre for Cellular and Molecular Biology, Indian Institute of Science, Indian Academy of Sciences, University of Hyderabad and helped in propagation of sciences in Hyderabad.

Death
On September 5, 2012, he gave an interview to a local television channel. He went missing on September 7th morning. On September 9th his body was found floating in Hussain Sagar Lake. The cause of death was suicide though other speculations were made.

References

Academic staff of Osmania University
Telugu people
1965 births
2012 deaths